Senate elections were held in Pakistan on 2 March 2012. Fifty-four of the 100 seats in the Senate were up for election with the winning candidates serving six-year terms.

Results

References

Sen
Senate elections in Pakistan
2012 in Pakistani politics